Lautaro Gianetti (born 13 November 1993) is an Argentine professional footballer who plays as a centre-back for Primera División side Vélez Sarsfield.

Club career
Gianetti debuted professionally for Vélez Sarsfield in the 2012 Clausura under Ricardo Gareca's coaching, starting in a 0–2 defeat to Argentinos Juniors. The defender was part of the squads that won the 2012 Inicial, 2012–13 Superfinal and 2013 Supercopa Argentina, although he did not play any games.

Gianetti became a starter for the team during the second half of the 2015 Argentine Primera División season, in which he started in all 15 games. He scored his first professional goal in the 12th fixture of the 2016 Argentine Primera División, a last-minute winner against Argentinos Juniors.

International career
Gianetti was part of the squad of the Argentina national under-20 football team that played the 2013 South American Youth Championship.

In 2016, the defender was selected by coach Gerardo Martino for the preliminary squad of the Argentina national under-23 football team to participate in the Summer Olympics. He was later confirmed by Martino's successor Julio Olarticoechea and started in all three games of the team in the tournament.

Honours
Vélez Sársfield
 Argentine Primera División: 2012 Inicial, 2012–13 Superfinal
 Supercopa Argentina: 2013

References

External links
Profile at Vélez Sársfield's official website 

Living people
1993 births
Argentine people of Italian descent
Argentine footballers
Association football defenders
Footballers at the 2016 Summer Olympics
Olympic footballers of Argentina
Footballers from Buenos Aires
Club Atlético Vélez Sarsfield footballers
Argentine Primera División players